Kalonji may refer to:

People
Albert Kalonji, Congolese politician
Gretchen Kalonji (born 1953), American scientist and academic administrator
Sizzla or Sizzla Kalonji (born 1976), Jamaican reggae musician
Kalonji Kashama

Other
 The black seeds of the plant Nigella sativa, used as a spice in Asian cooking
 Kalonji, the title in Europe and Asia of the album Freedom Cry by Sizzla